Nantawarra is a locality in South Australia located about  north of the Adelaide city centre and within the local government area known as the Wakefield Regional Council.  The locality occupies land on both sides of Highway 1 between Port Wakefield in the south and Snowtown in the north.  Nantawarra is recognisable from a distance by the presence of  grain silos immediately just east of the Adelaide-Port Augusta railway line.  The name Nantawarra may derive from the word nantuwara (meaning a northern yerta, or family group) in Kaurna, the language of the indigenous people of this part of South Australia.

Traditional occupants 
According to the Manning Index of South Australian History the "Nantuwwara [sic] tribe of some 25 to 30 once occupied the country from the River Wakefield, north to Whitwarta and west to Hummock Range", an area which would encompass the modern localities of Bowmans, Whitwarta, Goyder, Beaufort, Nantawarra and Mount Templeton. The term Nantuwara (or Nantuwaru) is considered to be a specific name for the northern hordes of the Kaurna people. Stone implements thought to have been used by the Nantuwara people were discovered at sites adjoining the banks of the lower reaches of the River Wakefield and added to a South Australian Museum collection curated by Harold Cooper in the 1960s.

See also
List of cities and towns in South Australia
Railway accidents in South Australia
Yorke Peninsula Field Days

References 

Towns in South Australia